Selters is a mineral water brand.

Selters may also refer to:

Selters, Rhineland-Palatinate, a town in the Westerwaldkreis, Rhineland-Palatinate, Germany
Selters (Verbandsgemeinde), a collective municipality in Westerwaldkreis, Rhineland-Palatinate, Germany
Selters (Taunus), a municipality near Limburg in the Limburg-Weilburg district, Hesse, Germany
Selters (Lahn), a village near Weilburg in the Limburg-Weilburg district, Hesse, Germany
Selters Spa, a local community and a spa in Mladenovac, a suburb of Belgrade, Serbia

See also
Selter (disambiguation)